Beverly Dahlen (born November 7, 1934) is an American poet who lives and works in San Francisco, CA.

Life and work
Dahlen is a native of Portland, Oregon, where she attended public schools. she moved with her family to Eureka, California, after World War II. In 1956, she resettled in San Francisco where she has lived for many years. Her first book, Out of the Third, was published by Momo's Press in 1974. Two chapbooks, A Letter at Easter (Effie's Press, 1976) and The Egyptian Poems (Hipparchia Press, 1983), were followed by the publication of the first volume of A Reading in 1985 (A Reading 1—7, Momo's Press). Since then, three more volumes of A Reading have appeared, a serial poem that continues to be in process.

Dahlen was a cofounder, with Kathleen Fraser and Frances Jaffer of the feminist poetics newsletter (HOW)ever. In December 2008 her work was honored by Small Press Traffic with their annual Lifetime Achievement Award. She also received a Foundation for Contemporary Arts Grants to Artists award (2013).

Selected publications

 [pamphlet]

A reading 18-20. Instance Press, 2006.

References

External links
Others on Dahlen
Tributes to Beverly Dahlen
Emily Dickinson and the Battle of Ball’s Bluff an appreciation of Dahlen by poet Benjamin Friedlander
READING A READING 18-20 an appreciation by poet and publisher Charles Alexander
Narrative Perversion: Beverly Dahlen’s A Reading - Something on Paper
Interviews
An Unending Reading: Part I of an interview interview with Dahlen conducted via email in October 2009
Thrilling to Throw One's Voice Out There: Part Two of an interview with Dahlen conducted in October 2009 via email
work by Dahlen
Poem & Picture: Beverly Dahlen and Laura Paulini
Working Notes
In Memoriam: Daniel Davidson epistolary tribute by Dahlen and Kevin Killian
Some notes on George Stanley’s Vancouver: A Poem
Audio files, readings & talks
Recording from March 15, 2008
Recording from April 14, 2007

Poets from Oregon
Living people
1934 births
American feminists
Writers from the San Francisco Bay Area
Writers from Portland, Oregon
American women poets
Poets from California
21st-century American women